Ujazdek  is a village in the administrative district of Gmina Bogoria, within Staszów County, Świętokrzyskie Voivodeship, in south-central Poland.

The village has a population of  90.

Demography 
According to the 2002 Poland census, there were 101 people residing in Ujazdek village, of whom 53.5% were male and 46.5% were female. In the village, the population was spread out, with 29.7% under the age of 18, 24.8% from 18 to 44, 20.8% from 45 to 64, and 24.8% who were 65 years of age or older.
 Figure 1. Population pyramid of village in 2002 — by age group and sex

References

Ujazdek